Gareth Rhydal Cliff (born 26 August 1977) is a South African radio and television personality. He began his professional radio career at 702, and later became the host of the breakfast show on 5FM. During his career at 5FM, his show included a feature called The Hollywood Report with Jen Su.

In January 2016 he won a court case to be reinstated as a judge on the television music competition show Idols South Africa on M-Net after being suspended for posting an allegedly racist remark on Twitter.

CliffCentral 

In 2014, he launched CliffCentral, an online content hub that specialises in podcasting and online radio. The content is uncensored and free from the regulations of the Broadcasting Complaints Commission of South Africa (BCCSA). His former 5FM breakfast team, Leigh-Ann Mol, Damon Kalvari and Mabale Moloi joined him in the new venture, and initially featured as part of his team on The Gareth Cliff Show. During one of the more outrageous stunts on CliffCentral, a show called SexTalk featured an orgasm live on air, on 31 July 2017 on National Orgasm Day. On 24 July 2019, Gareth Cliff hosted a panel of well-known South African broadcast personalities featuring DJ Fresh, DJ Sbu, Robert Marawa, Tbo Touch and Trevor Gumbi on Pure Conversations.

Blind History - a podcast series produced by CliffCentral and hosted by Gareth Cliff and Anthony Mederer — was nominated for a New York Festivals Radio Award in 2019 for Best Education podcast.

On 24 October 2021, Nando's had terminated their sponsorship (after 5 years) of Cliff's show, The Burning Platform, broadcast on CliffCentral with immediate effect following outrage over comments made by Gareth Cliff as host. Cliff described Mudzuli Rakhivhane's (member of One South Africa Movement) experiences of racism as "anecdotal" and "unimportant". Cliff had failed to provide a platform for free speech, talked over Rakhivhane, and prevented her from expressing her view sufficiently.

Other works 
Cliff wrote an autobiography entitled, Cliffhanger: Confessions of a Shock Jock, published in November 2016.

References

External links

Cliffcentral.com website

Living people
1977 births
Idols South Africa
 White South African people
People from Pretoria
South African radio presenters